The 1997–98 Bulgarian Cup was the 58th season of the Bulgarian Cup. Levski Sofia won the competition, beating CSKA Sofia 5–0 in the final at the Vasil Levski National Stadium in Sofia.

First round

|-
!colspan=3 style="background-color:#D0F0C0;" |11 November 1997

|-
!colspan=3 style="background-color:#D0F0C0;" |12 November 1997

|}

Second round

|-
!colspan=5 style="background-color:#D0F0C0;" |18, 19 November / 28, 29 November 1997

|}

Quarter-finals

|-
!colspan=5 style="background-color:#D0F0C0;" |3 / 13 December 1997 

|}

Semi-finals

|-
!colspan=5 style="background-color:#D0F0C0;" |15 April / 6 May 1998

|}
1Litex Lovech were disqualified from the competition after first leg because were fielded an ineligible player Radostin Kishishev.

Final

Details

References

1997-98
1997–98 domestic association football cups
Cup